Ross Brupbacher (born April 7, 1948) is a former professional American football linebacker who played in the National Football League.

Career
A 4th round selection (100th overall pick) of the 1970 NFL Draft out of Texas A&M University, Brupbacher played for four seasons for the Chicago Bears (1970–1972, 1976). He jumped to the World Football League in 1974 and played for the Birmingham Americans. Brupbacher was the defensive captain for the Americans, and helped lead them to the 1974 World Bowl championship game where they defeated the Florida Blazers 22-21.

Personal life
Brupbacher earned a Bachelor's degree in Management from Texas A&M in 1970 and a Juris Doctor from Louisiana State University's Paul M. Hebert Law Center seven years later in 1977. A member of the Louisiana State Bar Association, he practices law in the United States District Court for the Western District of Louisiana. He is a general practitioner whose primary focus is business consultations.

After the conclusion of his playing career, he has served as Sheriff of Lafayette Parish in Louisiana, trial attorney for Domengeaux, Wright, Roy & Edwards and general counsel for Lafayette General Medical Center.

References

1948 births
Living people
Sportspeople from Lafayette, Louisiana
Players of American football from Louisiana
American football linebackers
Texas A&M Aggies football players
Chicago Bears players
Birmingham Americans players